In mathematics and statistics, the continuity theorem may refer to one of the following results:
 the Lévy continuity theorem on random variables;
 the Kolmogorov continuity theorem on stochastic processes.

See also
 Continuity (disambiguation)
 Continuous mapping theorem